Eoconus sauridens is an extinct species of sea snail, a marine gastropod mollusk, in the family Conidae.

One subspecies: † Conus sauridens chiraensis A. A. Olsson, 1930

Description
The length of the shell attains 65 mm

Distribution
Fossils of this species were found in Eocene strata in Mississippi, Florida and Texas, US; also in Colombia, Panama and Peru.

References

 Conrad, Timothy Abbott. "ART. XVII. On some new Fossil and Recent Shells of the United States." American Journal of Science and Arts (1820-1879) 23.2 (1833): 339.
 W. H. Dall. 1916. A contribution to the invertebrate fauna of the Oligocene beds of Flint, River. Proceedings of the United States National Museum 51(2162):487-524
 B. L. Clark and J. W. Durham. 1946. Eocene Faunas from the Department of Bolivar, Colombia. Geological Society of America Memoir 16:1-126
 W. P. Woodring. 1970. Geology and paleontology of canal zone and adjoining parts of Panama: Description of Tertiary mollusks (gastropods: Eulimidae, Marginellidae to Helminthoglyptidae). United States Geological Survey Professional Paper 306(D):299–452
 J. R. Hendricks and R. W. Portell. 2008. Late Eocene Conus (Neogastropoda: Conidae) from Florida, US. The Nautilus 122(2):79–93

sauridens
Gastropods described in 1833